Paraburkholderia tuberum is a species of bacteria that is capable of symbiotic nitrogen fixation with the legume Aspalathus carnosa.

References

tuberum
Bacteria described in 2003